This is a list of notable events in country music that took place in the year 2005.

Events
April 30 – Billboard magazine renames the Hot Country Singles & Tracks chart "Hot Country Songs." The chart's renaming is part of a major redesign of the 110-year-old magazine.
May 25 – Oklahoma-born Carrie Underwood becomes the fourth-season winner of "American Idol." Although her first single, "Inside Your Heaven," tops the Billboard Hot 100 chart, the 22-year-old Underwood's influences and music are predominantly country. Late in the year, she entered the top 10 of the Billboard Hot Country Songs chart for the first time with "Jesus Take the Wheel". Her debut album, Some Hearts, rockets to No. 1 on the album charts.
May 25 – Garth Brooks proposes to longtime girlfriend and fellow country music star Trisha Yearwood in Bakersfield, California, ending long-standing speculation about their relationship.
September – Country music acts participate in benefit concerts to aid victims of Hurricane Katrina. On September 9, Dixie Chicks, Garth Brooks and Trisha Yearwood are among the artists participating in "Shelter from the Storm: A Concert for the Gulf Coast," which airs live on cable and broadcast television stations in the United States and worldwide.
"ReAct Now: Music & Relief" is held September 10. Country performers at the 4½-hour concert — which airs live on CMT – include Alan Jackson and Gretchen Wilson.
October – Koch Records Nashville folds when its parent company goes out of business.
November 9 – After 27 years as host of "American Country Countdown," radio personality Bob Kingsley steps down, after his production company and ABC Radio Networks (which distributes the show) fail to come to terms in renegotiating a distribution agreement. Kix Brooks, one half of the superstar duo Brooks & Dunn, is named the new host and was slated to take over January 21, 2006. Kingsley's last shows with "ACC" are the December 24 countdown program and "Christmas in America".
November 18 – The Johnny Cash biopic, Walk the Line, opens nationwide. The movie stars Joaquin Phoenix as "The Man in Black" and Reese Witherspoon as his girlfriend (and wife-to-be) June Carter. The movie is widely praised by critics and a major box office hit, culminating in Reese winning the Best Actress Oscar the following year.
November 25 – Garth Brooks releases The Limited Series, his second box set to be sold exclusively at Wal-Mart and Sam's Club stores. The set contains his previous two studio albums, Sevens and Scarecrow; plus his Double Live album; The Lost Sessions, a new album of previously unreleased material; and an All Access DVD containing behind-the-scenes footage of his concerts. The Limited Series is Brooks' first box set to be released under his label, Pearl Records; he had left his longtime label, Capitol Records, earlier in the year.
December 10 – Garth Brooks and Trisha Yearwood marry at their home in Oklahoma. It is Brooks' second marriage, Yearwood's third.
December 31 – Bob Kingsley's new countdown program, "Bob Kingsley's Country Top 40", premieres with the annual year-end countdown. The new four-hour show, which aired on many of the same stations that aired "ACC," is distributed by the Jones Radio Network.

No dates
Mindy McCready endures a rough year, with stories about her personal and legal problems making headlines. They include violent run-ins with her ex-boyfriend, Billy McKnight; various crimes she had been charged with (including fraud, prescription drug crimes, driving under the influence and probation violation) and at least two suicide attempts. Late in the year, Mindy spoke about her problems on The Oprah Winfrey Show and Larry King Live.
Toby Keith, the flagship artist for DreamWorks Nashville, departs to form his own label, Show Dog Nashville. DreamWorks – which had never really lived up to its expectations – is shut down shortly thereafter by its parent company, Universal Music Group.
The Country Music Association announces a new TV deal to move the CMA Awards to ABC, after years of being broadcast on CBS.
Tammy Genovese becomes the head of the Country Music Association, succeeding Ed Benson.
 Country music icon George Jones marks his 50th year in country music.

Top hits of the year
The following songs placed within the Top 20 on the Hot Country Songs charts in 2005:

Top new album releases
The following albums placed within the Top 50 on the Top Country Albums charts in 2005:

Other top albums

Deaths
February 6 – Merle Kilgore, 70, prolific songwriter ("Wolverton Mountain," "Ring of Fire") and manager of Hank Williams Jr. (cancer)
February 12 – Sammi Smith, 61, best known for "Help Me Make it Through the Night."
February 25- Goldie Hill, 72, best known for "I Let the Stars Get in My Eyes" and wife of Carl Smith.
March 2 – Joe Carter, 78, son of A.P. and Sara Carter.
March 9 – Chris LeDoux, 56, world champion bareback rider who sang about the rodeo circuit and cowboy life.
May 14 – Jimmy Martin, 77, the "King of Bluegrass."
 June 27 – Robert Byrne, 50, songwriter (unknown causes)
August 16 – Vassar Clements, 77, legendary fiddle player. (cancer)

Hall of Fame inductees

Bluegrass Music Hall of Fame inductees
Red Allen
Benny Martin

Country Music Hall of Fame inductees
Alabama (Randy Owen (born 1949); Teddy Gentry (born 1952); Jeff Cook (1949-2022); and Mark Herndon (born 1955)).
DeFord Bailey (1899–1982)
Glen Campbell (1936–2017)

Canadian Country Music Hall of Fame inductees
Gary Fjellgaard
R. Harlan Smith
Paul Kennedy

Major awards

Grammy Awards
(presented February 8, 2006 in Los Angeles)
Best Female Country Vocal Performance – "The Connection", Emmylou Harris
Best Male Country Vocal Performance – "You'll Think of Me", Keith Urban
Best Country Performance by a Duo or Group with Vocal – "Restless", Alison Krauss & Union Station
Best Country Collaboration with Vocals – "Like We Never Loved At All", Faith Hill and Tim McGraw
Best Country Instrumental Performance – "Unionhouse Branch", Alison Krauss & Union Station
Best Country Song – "Bless the Broken Road", Bobby Boyd, Jeff Hanna & Marcus Hummon
Best Country Album – Lonely Runs Both Ways, Alison Krauss & Union Station
Best Bluegrass Album – The Company We Keep, Del McCoury Band

Juno Awards
(presented April 2, 2006 in Halifax)
Country Recording of the Year – The Road Hammers, The Road Hammers

CMT Music Awards
(presented April 11 in Nashville)
Video of the Year – "Days Go By", Keith Urban
Male Video of the Year – "I Go Back", Kenny Chesney
Female Video of the Year – "When I Think About Cheatin'" Gretchen Wilson
Group/Duo Video of the Year – "Feels Like Today", Rascal Flatts
Breakthrough Video of the Year – "Redneck Woman", Gretchen Wilson
Collaborative Video of the Year – "Whiskey Lullaby", Brad Paisley Featuring Alison Krauss
Hottest Video of the Year – "Whiskey Girl", Toby Keith
Most Inspiring Video of the Year – "Live Like You Were Dying", Tim McGraw
Video Director of the Year – "Whiskey Lullaby", Brad Paisley Featuring Alison Krauss (Director: Rick Schroder)
Johnny Cash Visionary Award – Loretta Lynn

Americana Music Honors & Awards 
Album of the Year – Universal United House of Prayer (Buddy Miller)
Artist of the Year – John Prine
Song of the Year – "Worry Too Much" (Mark Heard)
Emerging Artist of the Year – Mary Gauthier
Instrumentalist of the Year – Sonny Landreth
Spirit of Americana/Free Speech Award – Judy Collins
Lifetime Achievement: Songwriting – Guy Clark
Lifetime Achievement: Performance – Marty Stuart
Lifetime Achievement: Executive – The Rounder Founders (Ken Irwin, Marian Leighton, Bill Nowlin)

Academy of Country Music 
(presented May 23, 2006 in Las Vegas)
Entertainer of the Year – Kenny Chesney
Song of the Year – "Believe", Ronnie Dunn and Craig Wiseman
Single of the Year – "Jesus, Take the Wheel", Carrie Underwood
Album of the Year – Time Well Wasted, Brad Paisley
Top Male Vocalist – Keith Urban
Top Female Vocalist – Sara Evans
Top Vocal Duo – Brooks & Dunn
Top Vocal Group – Rascal Flatts
Top New Male Vocalist – Jason Aldean
Top New Female Vocalist – Carrie Underwood
Top New Duo or Group – Sugarland
Video of the Year – "When I Get Where I'm Going", Brad Paisley and Dolly Parton (Director: Jim Shea)
Vocal Event of the Year – "When I Get Where I'm Going", Brad Paisley and Dolly Parton
ACM/Home Depot Humanitarian of the Year – Vince Gill
Pioneer Awards – Little Jimmy Dickens, Kris Kristofferson, Bill Monroe and Earl Scruggs

ARIA Awards 
(presented in Sydney on October 23, 2005)
Best Country Album – Be Here (Keith Urban)
ARIA Hall of Fame – Smoky Dawson

Canadian Country Music Association
(presented September 12 in Calgary)
Kraft Cheez Whiz Fans' Choice Award – George Canyon
Male Artist of the Year – George Canyon
Female Artist of the Year – Terri Clark
Group or Duo of the Year – The Road Hammers
SOCAN Song of the Year – "My Name", George Canyon, Gordie Sampson
Single of the Year – "My Name", George Canyon
Album of the Year – This Time Around, Paul Brandt
Top Selling Album – Greatest Hits, Shania Twain
CMT Video of the Year – "Convoy," Paul Brandt
Chevy Trucks Rising Star Award – Amanda Wilkinson
Roots Artist or Group of the Year – Corb Lund

Country Music Association
(presented November 15 in New York City)
Entertainer of the Year – Keith Urban
Song of the Year – "Whiskey Lullaby", Bill Anderson and Jon Randall
Single of the Year – "I May Hate Myself in the Morning", Lee Ann Womack
Album of the Year – There's More Where That Came From, Lee Ann Womack
Male Vocalist of the Year – Keith Urban
Female Vocalist of the Year – Gretchen Wilson
Vocal Duo of the Year – Brooks & Dunn
Vocal Group of the Year – Rascal Flatts
Horizon Award – Dierks Bentley
Video of the Year – "As Good As I Once Was", Toby Keith (Director: Michael Salomon)
Vocal Event of the Year – "Good News, Bad News", George Strait and Lee Ann Womack
Musician of the Year – Jerry Douglas

Further reading
Whitburn, Joel, "Top Country Songs 1944–2005 – 6th Edition." 2005.

References
Stark, Phyllis, "Toby Keith topped country charts, shook up Music Row," Billboard magazine, December 24, 2005, p. YE-18.

Notes

Other links
Country Music Association
Inductees of the Country Music Hall of Fame
2005 in Swiss music

External links
Country Music Hall of Fame

Country
Country music by year